HC Zalău is a women's handball club from Zalău, Romania, that plays in the Romanian Women's Handball League.

On domestic level HC Zalau won three league titles (2001,2004,2005) and Romanian Cup once in 2003.

In Europe HC Zalau won the Women's Women's EHF Challenge Cup 1995–1996 season and in the same season by participating in the EHF Women's Champions Trophy won 3rd place. In the 2011–2012 season in the EHF Cup HC Zalau played second final in history, lost against the Russian team Lada Togliatti.

History 
In 1978 Gheorghe Tadici - John Bal Crișan - Simon Talos trio, with Tadici in the main role, set foot in the city of Meseş a women's handball team called Didactica Zalău.

In 1979 Didactica Zalău get to promote Division B, moving, for the first time in official competition at the senior level. In 1980, Didactica Zalău turns to Textila Zalau,  textile enterprise is willing to invest in handball team.
Four years later, in 1984 Textila managed to promote the first scene of Romanian handball. Two years later the team would relegate in Division B in the 1985–1986 season and a year later to promote back to the first division after a perfect season. Since then handball team HC Zalău evolving  Romanian Handball League.

After two bronze medals in the seasons 1989 - 1990 and 1990 - 1991, Textila Zalău turns to Silcotex in 1992. Under this name, he became vice season 1993 - 1994 and in the same year (1994) changed their name for the third time, becoming Silcotub Zalău.

Again finishing 2nd in Romanian Handball League in the season 1995 - 1996, Silcotub Zalău have win at the end of the same season and EHF Challenge Cup or City Cup. Also in 1996 he finished third in the EHF Champions Trophy. For 14 consecutive years from 1994 to 2007 HC Zalău participated in European Cups, EHF Champions League, EHF Champions Trophy, EHF Cup Winners' Cup, EHF Cup and EHF Challenge Cup.

After the third title in history (2005) team changes its name to HC Zalău, earning the title of national runner at the end of the 2005–2006 season. At the end of the same season, Gheorghe Tadici had to leave for the Chimistul Râmnicu Vâlcea champion. Separation of Zalău handball would be almost fatal to the season 2007 - 2008, when HC Zalău, under the command of John Gherhardt, came to tour the dam to maintain in the National League.

Back to HC Zalău, after two years of absence, Gheorghe Tadici again resumed reconstruction of the team, saying it could even be the last in his career coach.

Kits

Arena 
Name: Sala Sporturilor „Gheorghe Tadici”
City: Zalău, România 
Address: Mihai Viteazul nr. 77, Zalău

Team

Current squad

Squad for the 2022-23 season

Goalkeepers
  Paula Vișan-Teodorescu
  Viorica Țăgean
  Alexandra Popescu

Wingers
LW
  Roberta Stamin
  Andreea Mihart
RW
  Gabriela Vrabie 
Line players
  Florentina Moisin
  Daniela Marin
  Andriyana Naumenko

Back players
  Krisztina Toth
  Emilija Lazić
  Andreea Mărginean
  Andreea Bujor
  Bianca Berbece
  Alexandra Pricop
  Diana Nichitean

Transfers
Transfers for 2022–2023

Joining

Leaving

Staff members 

  Chairman: Radu Istrate
  Head Coach: Gheorghe Tadici
  Assistant Coach: Elena Tadici 
  Masseur: Ileana Romocean
  Masseur: Daniela Morari

Honours

Europe
EHF Champions League:
Group stage: 3rd place: 2001-02
Qualification Round 2: 2004–05, 2005,06
EHF Champions Trophy:
 (1): 1996
EHF Cup Winners' Cup:
Semi-finals: 1994, 1998, 2001
Quarter-finals: 2003
Eighth-finals: 1999
Round 4: 2004
EHF Cup:
 (1): 2012
Semi-finals: 1992, 2013
Quarter-finals: 1991, 1995, 2000, 2005, 2018
Round 3: 2006, 2007, 2011
EHF Challenge Cup:
 (1): 1996
Semi-finals: 1997

Internal
Liga Naţională:
 (3): 2001, 2004, 2005
 (8): 1994, 1996, 1997, 1998, 1999, 2000, 2002, 2006
 (5): 1990, 1991, 1995, 2012, 2017
Cupa României:
 (1): 2003
 (5): 1993, 1996, 1997, 1998, 2002
Semi-finals: 1994, 1995, 1999, 2004, 2006
Supercupa României
 (1): 2011

Recent Seasons
Sezoane în Liga Naţională:32
Sezoane în Divizia A:7

Selected former players

  Claudia Constantinescu
  Teodora Bloj
  Crina Pintea
  Georgiana Ciuciulete
  Ana Maria Șomoi
  Valeria Motogna
  Gabriella Szűcs
  Alina Czeczi 
  Mirela Nichita
  Daniela Băbeanu
  Adriana Holhoș-Stoian
  Daniela Crap
  Talida Tolnai
  Daniela Morari
  Tereza Ludmila Pîslaru
  Raluca Iuliana Agrigoroaie
  Ramona Farcău
  Roxana Han (Gatzel)
  Alina Țurcaș-Jula
  Mihaela Pârâianu
  Mihaela Crăcană
  Carmen Buceschi
  Sanda Criste
  Alina Șorodoc (Măierean)
  Simona Spiridon
  Steluța Luca
  Marinela Pătru
  Artemizia-Aurica Sagmar
  Olimpia Vereș
  Lăcrămioara Fiastru
  Lucia Butnărașu
  Ana Șuhai
  Maria Elena Rădoi
  Claudia Constantinescu
  Roxana Szölösi

Coaches

References

External links 
  

Romanian handball clubs
Liga Națională (women's handball) clubs
Handball clubs established in 1978
1978 establishments in Romania
Zalău